Benjamin "Ben" Tupay Loong (NPC) is the Vice Governor of Sulu Province (2009–present) in the Philippines, a part of the Autonomous Region in Muslim Mindanao.  He was the Governor of Sulu Province from 2005 to 2007, and is the younger brother of Tupay T. Loong, the current representative from Sulu's 1st District.

Background
Loong is a native of Parang, Sulu.

Political activity
Loong started out as a businessman, running a coco oil company and serving as a member of the Mindanao Business Council (MBC).  However, he quickly entered politics alongside his brother. He won his first election as ARMM vice-regional governor. He ran as an independent for ARMM Vice-Governor alongside Ibrahim Paglas, a former mayor and businessman, but was bested by Administration-backed candidates Parouk Hussin and Mahid Mutilan.

He became head of the MBC and competed in the Sulu provincial elections in 2005, this time winning the Governor slot.  However, Loong was sidelined in the 2007 election in a political shifting of loyalties involving Abdulmunir Mundoc Arbison shifting his support to Abdusakur Mahail Tan.

He came back in 2010 to be elected Vice Governor of Sulu with 113,678 votes, according to COMELEC data.  He was supported by then President Gloria Arroyo.

The Loong brothers are known to be political rivals with Governor Tan and former ARMM assemblyman Garcia Tingkahan.

Business dealings
Loong was president and CEO of BJ Coco Oil Mill, a company producing coconut oil.

References

Lakas–CMD politicians
PDP–Laban politicians
Governors of Sulu
Living people
People from Sulu
Filipino Muslims
Year of birth missing (living people)